The men's 3000 metres at the 2010 IAAF World Indoor Championships was held at the ASPIRE Dome on 12 and 14 March.

Medalists

Records

Qualification standards

Schedule

Results

Heats
Qualification: First 4 in each heat (Q) and the next 4 fastest (q) advance to the final.

Final

References

Heats Results
Final Result

3000 metres
3000 metres at the World Athletics Indoor Championships